Multifurca roxburghiae is a species of mushroom-forming fungus in the genus Russulaceae. Found in Himachal Pradesh, India, where it associates with chir pine (Pinus roxburghii), it was described as new to science in 2008.

References

External links
 

Russulales
Fungi described in 2008
Fungi of Asia